Kunzea aristulata is a flowering plant in the myrtle family, Myrtaceae and is endemic to a small area of New South Wales. It is an erect, spreading shrub similar to Kunzea rupestris but is distinguished from it mainly by the shape of its leaves. It is only known from a remote area north of Yerranderie where it often grows on cliff edges.

Description
The leaves often abruptly taper to a sharp point. Only the midvein of the leaf is prominent. The flowers are usually arranged in clusters of between five and fifteen flowers on the ends of the branches.

Taxonomy and naming
Kunzea aristulata was first formally described in 2016 by Hellmut Toelken and the description was published in Journal of the Adelaide Botanic Garden. The specific epithet (aristulata) is the diminutive form of the Latin word aristatus meaning "awned" or "with ears" referring to the short point on the end of the leaves.

Distribution and habitat
This kunzea grows in open forest, often on cliff edges, north of Yerranderie.

References

aristulata
Flora of New South Wales
Myrtales of Australia
Plants described in 2016
Taxa named by Hellmut R. Toelken